The Plaza is a historic apartment building located at Indianapolis, Indiana.  It was built in 1907, and is a three-story, "U"-shaped, glazed orange brick and grey limestone building. It features a full facade Renaissance Revival style entrance with Ionic order columns and polygonal bay windows on the upper stories.

It was listed on the National Register of Historic Places in 1983.

References

Apartment buildings in Indiana
Residential buildings on the National Register of Historic Places in Indiana
Renaissance Revival architecture in Indiana
Residential buildings completed in 1907
Residential buildings in Indianapolis
National Register of Historic Places in Indianapolis